Amy Gaipa is a former American actress. She is best known for playing Trudy Bolt, the female lead character Rose's maid in James Cameron's Titanic.
Gaipa was born in 1970, attended Lake Michigan Catholic High School in St. Joseph, Michigan, and graduated from Hope College, Holland, Michigan in 1992 with a B.A. in Theatre.

Partial filmography
Titanic (1997) - Trudy Bolt
An Englishman in New York (2009) - Audience Member # 2
Silver Tongues (2011) - Naomi
La vida inesperada (2013) - Carol (final film role)

References

External links 
 

Living people
American film actresses
1970 births
Hope College alumni
Place of birth missing (living people)
21st-century American women